The 2014–15 Iowa State Cyclones men's basketball team represented Iowa State University during the 2014–15 NCAA Division I men's basketball season. The Cyclones were coached by Fred Hoiberg, who was in his fifth season. They played their home games at Hilton Coliseum in Ames, Iowa and competed in the Big 12 Conference.

They finished the season 25–9, 12–6 in Big 12 play to finish in second place.  They defeated Texas, Oklahoma, and Kansas to become champions of the Big 12 Conference tournament to earn an automatic bid to the NCAA tournament. In the NCAA Tournament they were upset by UAB in the first round.

At the conclusion of the season, head coach Fred Hoiberg accepted the same position with the Chicago Bulls of the NBA.

Previous season

The Cyclones finished 28–8, and 11–7 in Big 12 play to finish in a tie for 3rd place in the regular season conference standings.  They defeated Kansas State, Kansas, and Baylor to become champions of the Big 12 Conference tournament to earn and automatic bid to the NCAA tournament.  In the NCAA Tournament they defeated North Carolina Central and North Carolina to advance to the Sweet Sixteen where they lost to UConn.

Offseason departures

Recruiting

Prep recruits

Incoming transfers

Roster

Schedule and results

|-
!colspan=12 style=""|Exhibition
|-

|-
!colspan=12 style=""| Regular Season
|-

|-

|-
!colspan=12 style=""| Big 12 Tournament
|-

|-

|-

|-
!colspan=12 style=""| NCAA Tournament
|-

|-

Rankings

Awards and honors

All-Americans

Georges Niang (3rd Team)

Big 12 Defensive Player of the Year

Jameel McKay

All-Conference Selections

Georges Niang (1st Team)
Monté Morris (2nd Team)
Jameel McKay (3rd Team)
Dustin Hogue (Honorable Mention)

Big 12 All-Tournament Team

Georges Niang (MVP)
Monté Morris

Big 12 All-Defensive Team

Jameel McKay

Big 12 All-Newcomer Team

Jameel McKay

Academic All-Big 12 First Team

Matt Thomas (basketball)

References

Iowa State Cyclones men's basketball seasons
Iowa State
Iowa State
Iowa State Cyc
Iowa State Cyc